Francesco Maria Veracini (1 February 1690 – 31 October 1768) was an Italian composer and violinist, perhaps best known for his sets of violin sonatas. As a composer, according to Manfred Bukofzer, "His individual, if not subjective, style has no precedent in baroque music and clearly heralds the end of the entire era", while Luigi Torchi maintained that "he rescued the imperiled music of the eighteenth century", His contemporary, Charles Burney, held that "he had certainly a great share of whim and caprice, but he built his freaks on a good foundation, being an excellent contrapuntist". The asteroid 10875 Veracini was named after him.

Life

Francesco Maria Veracini was born at about 8:00 a.m. on 1 February 1690 in the family house on the via Palazzuolo, parish of San Salvatore, Ognissanti, Florence. The second and only surviving son of Agostino Veracini, a pharmacist and undertaker (and ironically one of the few Veracinis who was not a violinist, even as an amateur) he was taught the violin by his uncle, Antonio Veracini, with whom he later often appeared in concert, as well as by Giovanni Maria Casini and his assistant Francesco Feroci. His grandfather, Francesco (di Niccolò) Veracini, had been one of the first violinists of Florence, and ran a music school in the house until ill health forced him to turn the business over to his eldest son, Antonio, in 1708. In addition, the family managed a painting studio and possessed a large collection of art works, including four Ghirlandaios, a Rubens, a Caracci and a dozen other paintings by the three members of the family from two generations, including Francesco's third son, Benedetto. The painter Niccolò Agostino Veracini was  Francesco Maria's cousin. Veracini esteemed Carlo Ambrogio Lonati as a great violinist.

He is known to have been a soloist in Venice at the Christmas masses at San Marco, on 24 and 25 December 1711. On 1 February 1712 he performed a violin concerto of his own composition (the first recorded public performance by Veracini playing one of his own compositions), accompanied by trumpets, oboes, and strings as part of the celebrations in honour of the Austrian ambassador to Venice of the newly elected Holy Roman Emperor, Charles VI. The celebration, held in Santa Maria Gloriosa dei Frari included a vocal Te Deum and Mass, as well as motets and concertos performed under the direction of padre Ferdinando Antonio Lazari. The manuscript scores of all the works performed that day, including Veracini's concerto, were bound together in a handsome presentation volume now found in the National Library of Austria. According to another opinion, this concerto was Veracini's Violin Concerto in D Major, "a otto strumenti, di Francesco Maria Ueracini Suonato dallo stesso al post comunio", 1711), but was performed in Frankfurt rather than Venice, at Charles VI's coronation on 22 December 1711, just two days before Veracini's appearance as a soloist on Christmas Eve in Venice, some 800 kilometers to the south.

In 1714, Veracini went to London and played instrumental pieces ("symphonies" in contemporary parlance) between the acts of operas at the Queen's Theatre. At the court of Johann Wilhelm, Elector Palatine and Anna Maria Luisa de' Medici he performed his oratorio Mosè al Mar Rosso. In 1716 he was appointed as the head of a Venetian music school.  There is a legend that, when Giuseppe Tartini heard Veracini playing the violin, he was so impressed by his bowing technique, and so dissatisfied with his own skill, that he retreated the next day to Ancona "in order to study the use of the bow in more tranquility, and with more convenience than at Venice, as he had a place assigned him in the opera orchestra of that city".

Veracini wrote a set of violin/recorder sonatas dedicated to Prince Friedrich August, who came to celebrate carnival. The Prince recruited not only singers, as he was told to do by his father, but also musicians for the court in Dresden.  He hired an entire opera company under the direction of the Italian composer Antonio Lotti, the librettist Antonio Maria Lucchini, the castrati Senesino and Matteo Berselli, the brothers Mauro architects, two painters, and two carpenters (Charlton 2000). In 1718 the Prince also secured the services of the eccentric Francesco Maria Veracini—at a very high salary— Johann David Heinichen and Giuseppe Maria Boschi.

Dresden

To justify his salary, Veracini had to compose chamber music for the court, transferring him to the official payroll as Kapellmeister in August 1717 and not as a violinist. In 1719 Veracini was sent to recruit more Italian singers for the new Dresden opera, "am Zwinger". Whilst in Venice he secured the services of Margherita Durastanti and Vittorio Tesi and in Bologna added Maria Antonia Laurenti. Veracini also took the opportunity to visit his home town where he married Chiara Tesi.

In 1721 Veracini wrote another set of violin sonatas dedicated to the Prince (published in Dresden as his Opus 1). Unfortunately, there was animosity among all these gifted musicians at the court in Dresden. In 1722, the arrogant Veracini was involved in a quarrel, staged according to one source by the composer and violinist Pisendel, which resulted in Veracini leaping out of an upper-story window and breaking his foot in two places and (also) his hip. There are two conflicting accounts of this incident on August 13, one involving humiliation of Veracini at the hands of the last-desk violinist in the orchestra, who was asked to play the same concerto, replacing Veracini. Pisendel had been rehearsing his composition intensively with this violinist. The braggart Veracini fell into such a rage over this that he did not come out of his room for several days, and out of shame and despair finally publicly threw himself out of a window onto the street in Dresden. According to Veracini the jealous German musicians allegedly plotted to murder him (so he claimed in his writings). He fled Dresden by jumping out a window and apparently broke a leg in the fall.  After the incident Veracini walked with a limp for the rest of his life. It is a myth Senesino was involved in the quarrel as he was either dismissed by Heinichen or by the court which ran out of money. G.F. Handel offered the singer a contract for London two years before the alleged incident with Veracini.

It seems the Dresden musicians, fearing for their position, felt relieved Veracini had left the city. Back in his native Florence in 1723, Veracini played music in a church. During this time he suffered from his bad reputation and was said by Charles Burney to have been "usually qualified with the title of Capo pazzo" ["head lunatic"]. He composed a Te Deum for the coronation of Pope Clement XII in 1730.

His uncle Antonio died in 1733, leaving the bulk of his estate to Francesco Maria. Amongst other things, this included no fewer than eight violins made by Jacob Stainer and three Amatis.

London

Back in London in 1733, Veracini appeared in many concerts. In 1735 he composed an opera for the Opera of the Nobility, Adriano in Siria. Francesca Cuzzoni, Antonio Montagnana, Farinelli and Senesino had a role. George Frederic Handel was present at the premiere in Haymarket Theatre. Charles Jennens liked the opera and ordered a score; Lord Hervey, not known for his musical perception, and Henry Liddell, 1st Baron Ravensworth were bored. However, the work enjoyed a run of twenty performances over six months. Many of the arias were published separately by John Walsh . Veracini composed the fifth version, based on Pietro Metastasio’s libretto, written for the Habsburg Emperor Charles VI. The score, which survived in the Newman Flower Collection (or the Henry Watson Music Library?) of the Manchester Central Library was developed by German musicologist Holger Schmitt-Hallenberg along with Fabio Biondi, who composed the recitatives that have not been preserved. It was performed in Kraków December 2013 and in Vienna and Madrid in January 2014.

In 1736 he wrote some arias for the pasticcio Orfeo by Nicola Porpora. In 1737, he wrote La Clemenza di Tito, on a libretto by Angelo Maria Cori based on Metastasio.  In 1738 Veracini wrote his third opera, Partenio, and returned to Florence where he stayed till 1741. Back in London he composed his last opera, Roselinda, based on Shakespeare's play As You Like It, a most unusual choice of material at that time. In that opera Veracini included the well-known Scots ballad tune The Lass of Paties Mill. It was staged in London in 1744, the same year his oratorio L'errore di Salomone was staged. Burney, scorned the music of Roselinda as "wild, awkward, and unpleasant; manifestly produced by a man unaccustomed to write for the voice, and one possessed of a capo pazzo", and ridiculed the inclusion of the ballad tune as an attempt "to flatter the English" that failed because "few of the North Britons, or admirers of this national and natural Music, frequent the opera, or mean to give half a guinea to hear a Scots tune, which perhaps their cook-maid Peggy can sing better than any foreigner", but confessed that "This opera, to my great astonishment when I examined the Music, ran twelve nights", whereas L'errore di Salomone was given only twice. Veracini left London a little more than a year later.

In 1745 or shortly after, he survived a shipwreck in which he lost two of his Stainer violins (the ones he called St. Peter and St. Paul), "thought to have been the best in the world", and all of his effects. He returned to Florence, where he was appointed maestro di capella of the churches of San Pancrazio and San Gaetano, the latter one at which his uncle had worked, focusing on church music. Though he mostly conducted in his later years, he still sometimes appeared as a violinist. Veracini died in Florence.

Compositions
In addition to violin sonatas, edited by Ferdinand David, operas and oratorios, Veracini also wrote violin concertos, sonatas for recorder and basso continuo, and orchestral suites, called Overtures. The six Overtures were performed for Prince Friedrich August in Venice in 1716, as part of Veracini's ultimately successful attempt to secure a position at the Dresden court. They are all either in F major or B-flat major, except for one in G minor. The last one of these, in B-flat major, is remarkable for concluding with a unison minuet. Veracini also wrote a "lively, highly original theory treatise", Il trionfo della pratica musicale, and edited other composers' works, adding "improvements" of his own, such as he did in his Dissertazioni with the Opus 5 Violin Sonatas of Arcangelo Corelli.

Major works

12 Sonatas for recorder or violin solo and basso (no opus number, dedicated to Prince Friedrich August, before 1716, unpublished in the composer's lifetime)
Opus 1, 12 Sonatas for violin solo and basso (dedicated to Prince Friedrich August, 1721)
Opus 2, 12 Sonate Accademiche for violin solo and basso (1744)
Dissertazioni del Sigr. Francesco Veracini sopra l'opera quinta del Corelli [Dissertation by Mr. Francesco Veracini on Corelli's Opus 5] (date of composition uncertain, unpublished until 1961)
Opus 3, Il trionfo della pratica musicale, osia Il maestro dell’arte scientifica dal quale imparsi non-solo il contrapunto ma (quel che più importa) insegna ancore con nuovo e facile metodo l’ordine vero di comporre in musica (music-theory treatise, 1760)

Discography
 The Art of Bel Canto. Richard Tucker, tenor; John Wustman, piano and harpsichord. LP. Columbia ML 6067 Also issued in stereo, MS 6667 [U.S.]: Columbia, 1965. [Includes Veracini: "Meco verrai su quella" (Pastorale) from 'Rosalinda']
 The Art of Joseph Szigeti, vol. 1. Joseph Szigeti, violin; Kurt Ruhrseitz, piano (Recorded 1926–1933). 2 CDs (mono). London, England: Biddulph Recordings, 1989. LAB 005, LAB 006. [Includes Veracini: Largo, from an unidentified sonata.]
 An Arthur Grumiaux Recital. Arthur Grumiaux, violin; Riccardo Castagnone, piano. LP (mono). Epic LC 3414 [United States]: Epic Records, 1957. [Includes Veracini: Sonata in A major, op. 1, no.7.]
 Baroque Masters of Venice, Naples and Tuscany. Soloists of the Società cameristica di Lugano. LP. "A Cycnus recording, Paris." [New York]: Nonesuch Records, 1966. HC 3008. [Includes an unidentified work by Veracini]
 Concerti "per l'orchestra di Dresda". Musica Antiqua Köln; Reinhard Goebel, dir. CD. Archiv Produktion 447 644–2. Hamburg: Deutsche Grammophon, 1993. [Includes Veracini: Ouverture No. 5 in B-flat major.]
 Flute Solos. James J Pellerite, flute; Wallace Hornibrook, piano. Coronet LPS 1505 (LP). Columbus, Ohio: Coronet, [1960s]. [Includes Veracini: Sonata no. 1 (1716).]
 French and Italian Flute Music. Barthold Kuijken, flute; Wieland Kuijken, viola da gamba; Robert Kohnen, harpsichord. 2 CDs. Accent ACC 30009. Heidelberg: Accent, 2007. [Sonatas; violin, continuo; op. 1, no. 6, arranged for flute and continuo]
 Furiosi. I Furiosi (Gabrielle McLaughlin, soprano; Aisslinn Nosky, Julia Wedman, violin; Felix Deak, violoncello, viola da gamba); with James Johnstone, harpsichord; Stephanie Martin, organ; Lucas Harris, theorbo and guitar. CD. Dorian DSL-90802. Winchester, VA: Dorian, 2007. [Includes Veracini: Passagallo, first movement from Sonata, op. 2, no. 12 in D minor.]
 Italian Baroque Songs. Dénes Gulyás, tenor; Dániel Benkö, lute, guitar, orpharion; László Czidra, recorder; Tibor Alpár, organ; Budapest Baroque Trio; Bakfark Consort. CD. Hungaroton HCD 31480. [Hungary]: Hungaroton, 1992. [Includes Veracini: Sonata for violin, continuo, op. 1; No. 3.]
Italian Baroque Violin Concerti. Carroll Glenn, violin; Austrian Tonkuenstler Orchestra, Vienna; Lee Schaenen, conductor. LP. Musical Heritage Society MHS 652 New York: Musical Heritage Society, 1966. [Includes Veracini: Concerto for Violin and Orchestra in D major]
 The Italian Connection: Vivaldi, Corelli, Geminiani, Lonati, Veracini, Matteis. Bell'arte Antiqua (Lucy van Dael, Jacqueline Ross, violins; William Hunt, viola da gamba; Terence Charlston, harpsichord). CD. London: ASV, 2000. CD GAU 199. [Includes Veracini: Sonata in A, op. 2, no. 9]
 Italian Music for Strings of the Baroque Period. Cambridge Society for Early Music; Erwin Bodky, director; Ruth Posselt, Richard Burgin, violins. LP (mono). Kapp KCL 9024 [Includes Veracini: Sonata op. 1, no. 3.]
 An Italian Sojourn. Trio Settecento. CD. Chicago: Cedille, 2006. [Includes Veracini: Sonata in D minor, op. 2, no. 12.]
 Italian Violin Sonatas. Europa Galante (Fabio Biondi, violin and direction; Maurizio Naddeo, violoncello; Giangiacomo Pinardi, theorbo, baroque guitar, cittern; Sergio Ciomei, harpsichord, organ, gracivembalo, clavichord). Virgin Veritas 5 45588 2 (CD). [England]: Virgin, 2002. [Includes Veracini: Sonata in G minor, op. 1 no. 1]
 Italienische Blockflötenmusik des 17. und 18. Jahrhunderts. Eckhardt Haupt, recorder; Achim Beyer, violin; Christine Schornsheim, harpsichord; Siegfried Pank, tenor viola da gamba. CD. Capriccio 10 234. Königsdorf: Delta Music GmbH, 1988. [Includes Veracini: Sonata no. 6 in A minor (1716)]
 Blockflötenwerke von 10 italienischen Meistern. Frans Brüggen, recorder; Anner Bylsma, violoncello; Gustav Leonhardt, harpsichord and organ. 3LPs. Telefunken Das Alte Werk 6.35073. Hamburg: Telefunken, 1968–74. Reissued on CD as Italian Recorder Sonatas. Teldec 4509-93669-2. Hamburg: Teldec, 1995. [Includes Veracini: Sonata no. 2 (1716) in G major; Sonata no. 6 (1716) in A minor]
 Masters of the Italian Baroque. Steven Staryk, violin. Kenneth Gilbert, harpsichord. LP. Baroque BUS 2874. Baroque Records, [1967]. [Includes Veracini: Sonata in E minor.]
 Maurice André Plays Trumpet Concertos. Maurice André, trumpet; Pierre Pierlot, oboe; Orchestre de chambre Jean-François Paillard, Jean François Paillard, cond. (LP) New York, N.Y.: Musical Heritage Society, 1969. [Includes Veracini: Sonata in E minor for violin and continuo, op. 2, no. 8, arranged as a trumpet concerto by Jean Thilde]
 Six Italian Sonatas. Michel Piguet, baroque oboe and recorder; Walther Stiftner, baroque bassoon; Martha Gmünder, harpsichord. Musical Heritage Society MHS 1864 (LP). New York: Musical Heritage Society, 1974. [Includes Veracini: Sonata prima in F major for recorder and harpsichord.] Title from container./ "Recorded by Erato."
Tetrazzini. Luisa Tetrazzini, soprano; with unidentified orchestras. Recorded between 1909 and 1914, digitally re-recorded from the original 78 rpm discs. CD. Wyastone Leys, Monmouth: Nimbus Records, 1990. [Includes Veracini: "Meco sulla verrai" (Pastorale), from Rosalinda.]
Veracini, Francesco Maria. 5 ouvertures / Ouvertüren / Overtures. Musica Antiqua Köln; Reinhard Goebel, dir. CD. Archiv Produktion 439 937-2. Hamburg: Deutsche Grammophon, 1994. [Ouvertures No. 1 B-flat major; No. 2 in F major; No. 3 in B-flat major; No. 4 in F major; No. 6 in B-flat major.]
 Veracini, Francesco Maria: Complete Overtures and Concertos, vol. 1. Accademia i Filarmonici; Alberto Martini, conductor. CD. Naxos 8.553412. Munich: Naxos, 1995.
 Veracini, Francesco Maria: Complete Overtures and Concertos, vol. 2 Accademia i Filarmonici; Alberto Martini, conductor. CD. Naxos 8.553413. [Hong Kong]: Naxos, 1999. [Concerto a otto stromenti in D major for violin and orchestra; Overture no. 5 in B-flat major; Concerto a cinque in A major for violin, strings, and continuo; Concerto a cinque in D major for violin strings, and continuo; Aria schiavona in B-flat major for orchestra.]
 Veracini, Francesco Maria. The Complete Sonatas, op. 1. Hyman Bress, violin; Jean Schrick, viola da Gamba; Oliver Alain, harpsichord. 3 LPs. Lyrichord and LLST 7141 (set); LLST 7138, LLST 7139, LLST 7140. Lyrichord;. New York: Lyrichord Records, 1965.
 Veracini, Francesco Maria. Nine Sonatas for Violin and Basso Continuo. Piero Toso, violin; Gianni Chiampan, violoncello; Edoardo Farina, harpsichord. 2 LPs. Erato 71197. Reissued on Musical Heritage Society MHS 4293, MHS 4294. Tinton Falls, N.J.: Musical Heritage Society, 1978. [Includes Sonatas in G minor, op. 1, no. 1; A major, op. 1, no. 2; B minor, op. 1, no. 3; E minor, op. 1, no. 6; A major, op. 1, no. 7; B-flat major, op. 1, no. 8; D major, op. 1, no. 10; E major, op. 1, no. 11; F major, op. 1, no. 12.] "Licensed from."
Veracini, Francesco Maria. Six Sonatas for Flute and Harpsichord. Giorgio Bernabò, flute; Alan Curtis, harpsichord. CD. Dynamic CDS 114. Genoa: Dynamic Srl, 1994. [Sonatas no. 1, 3, 4, 5, 11, and 12 (1716).]
Veracini, Francesco Maria. Sonatas. John Holloway, violin; Jaap ter Linden, cello; Lars Ulrik Mortensen, harpsichord. CD. ECM New Series Munich: ECM Records, 2003. [Sonata no. 1 from Sonate a violino solo e basso, op. 1; Sonata no. 5 from Sonate a violino, o flauto solo, e basso (1716); Sonata no. 1 from Dissertazioni—sopra l'opera quinta del Corelli, Sonata no. 6 from Sonate accademiche, op. 2]
 Veracini, Francesco Maria. Sonate accademiche. Fabio Biondi, violin; Maurizio Naddeo, violoncello; Rinaldo Alessandrini, harpsichord; Pascal Monteilhet, theorbo. CD. Paris, France: Opus 111, 1995. OPS 30–138. [Includes Veracini: Sonatas op. 2, nos. 7, 8, 9, and 12]
 Veracini, Francesco Maria: Sonate accademiche. The Locatelli Trio (Elizabeth Wallfisch, violin; Richard Tunnicliffe, violoncello; Paul Nicholson, harpsichord & organ). 3 CDs. Hyperion CDA 66871/3. London: Hyperion Records Ltd., 1995. Reissued 2007, Hyperion CDS44241/3.
 The Virtuose Italienische Blockflötenmusik. Michael Schneider, recorder; Michael McCraw, bassoon; Gerhart Darmstadt, cello; Bradford Tracey, harpsichord. CD. FSM Adagio FCD 91 634 Münster: Fono Schallplattengesellschaft mbH, 1990. [Includes Veracini: Sonata no. 4 in B-flat major (1716).]
 The Virtuoso Harmonica. Adalberto Borioli, harmonica; Mirna Miglioranzi-Borioli, harpsichord. LP. Everest SDBR 3172. Los Angeles, Calif.: Everest, 1967. [Includes Veracini: Sonata in F major]
 The Virtuoso Recorder. Frans Brüggen, recorder; Janny van Wering, harpsichord. LP. Decca DL 710049. New York: Decca, 1962. [Includes Veracini: Sonata in G major (1716)]
 The Virtuoso Violinist. David Nadien, violin; Boris Barere, piano. LP. Kapp KCL 9060. [U.S.]: Kapp Records, 1961 [Includes Veracini: Largo, from Sonate accademiche, no. 6.]

Sources
 Anon. 1734. Adriano in Siria: Dramma per musica. Versione sintetica a cura di www.librettidopera.it (accessed 1 February 2014).
 Anon. 2013. "Adriano in Siria: Dramma per musica". Libretti d’opera italiana (www.librettidopera.it, accessed 3 February 2014).
 Anon. 2014. About the Henry Watson Music Library: Central Library Temporary Closure. (Accessed 1 February 2014).
 
 
Charlton, David. 2000. "Johann David Heinichen (1683–1729)". ClassicalNet (accessed 3 February 2014).
 
 
 
 Lecerf de la Viéville de Fresneuse, Jean Laurent. 1722. "Des Französischen Anwalds", [translated and edited by Johann Mattheson], in Critica Musica 1, no. 3, parts 7 (November): 189–207, and 8 (December): 209–31.
 [Mattheson, Johann]. 1722. "Neues: Von musicalischen Sachen und Personen: Dresden". Critica Musica 1, no. 2, part 5 (September): 151–52. 
 [Mattheson, Johann]. 1723. "[Neues: Von musicalischen Sachen und Personen: Dresden]". Critica Musica 1, no. 4, part 10 (February): 287– 88 (accessed 7 February 2014).
 Ministry of Culture and National Heritage of the Republic of Poland. 2013. "Jacek Majchrowski, Mayor of the City of Krakow, Invites: Europa Galante". Serwis www.operarara.pl website (accessed 1 February 2014).
 Rees, Abraham.1819. "Veracini, Antonio". The Cyclopædia: Or, Universal Dictionary of Arts, Sciences, and Literature, Volume 36. London: Longman, Hurst, Rees, Orme & Brown.
 
 Talbot, Michael. 1974. "Some Overlooked MSS in Manchester". The Musical Times 115, no. 1581 (November): 942-44.

Footnotes

External links
 List of works by Francesco Maria Veracini

World's first recording of Veracini's Violin Sonatas featuring Luigi Mangiocavallo (violin)
Performance of Overture in G minor by the Akademie für Alte Musik Berlin from the Isabella Stewart Gardner Museum in MP3 format

1690 births
1768 deaths
Musicians from Florence
Italian Baroque composers
Italian male classical composers
Italian opera composers
Male opera composers
Italian violinists
Male violinists
18th-century Italian composers
18th-century Italian male musicians